is a village located in Yamanashi Prefecture, Japan. ,  the village had an estimated population of 1676 in 623 households, and a population density of 21 persons per km². The total area of the village is 79.57  km².

Geography
Dōshi is in the far southeastern corner of Yamanashi Prefecture, in the Tanzawa Mountains, which isolate it from the rest of the prefecture to the north and east. The village is mostly forest and has numerous campsites.

Neighboring municipalities
Yamanashi Prefecture
Uenohara
Tsuru
Yamanakako
Kanagawa Prefecture
Sagamihara
Yamakita

Climate
The village has a climate characterized by characterized by hot and humid summers, and relatively mild winters (Köppen climate classification Cfa).  The average annual temperature in Dōshi is 11.8 °C. The average annual rainfall is 1677 mm with September as the wettest month. The temperatures are highest on average in August, at around 25.9 °C, and lowest in January, at around 2.0 °C.

Demographics
Per Japanese census data, the population of Dōshi has gradually decreased over the past 70 years.

History
During the Edo period, all of Kai Province was tenryō territory under direct control of the Tokugawa shogunate. With the establishment of the modern municipalities system  in the early Meiji period in 1889, the village of Dōshi was created in Minamitsuru District, Yamanashi Prefecture. From 1897, the Dōshigawa River, which runs through the village, was designated as a primary source of water for the growing city of Yokohama. From 1916 a large portion of the village land area was designated as a protected watershed.

On June 12, 2003, 653 of the village residents signed a petition to be allowed the village to merge with the city of Yokohama. However, the petition was rejected by the Yamanashi Prefectural Assembly, citing complications over a cross-prefectural merger and issues with the village becoming an exclave of the Yokohama metropolis.

Economy
The economy of Dōshi is primarily based on forestry and agriculture.

Education
Dōshi has one public elementary school and one public junior high school operated by the village government. The village does not have a high school.

Transportation

Railway
 Dōshi has no railway service.

Highway

References

External links

Official Website 

Villages in Yamanashi Prefecture
Dōshi, Yamanashi